Dr. Who is a character based on the Doctor, the protagonist featuring in the long-running BBC science fiction television series Doctor Who.

The character, portrayed by the actor Peter Cushing, appeared in two films produced by AARU Productions; Dr. Who and the Daleks (1965) and Daleks' Invasion Earth 2150 A.D. (1966). Plans for a third film were abandoned following the poor box office reception of the second film.

Cushing made no mention of the films in his autobiography, although he kept a collection of newspaper clippings about them in a scrapbook.

Personality
Whereas the contemporary television incarnation of the character was depicted as an abrasive, patronising and cantankerous extraterrestrial, as portrayed by Cushing Dr. Who is an eccentric inventor who claims to have created a time machine, named Tardis, in his back garden. He is a gentle, grandfatherly figure, naturally curious, sometimes absent-minded but not afraid to fight for justice. He is shown to have a keen and somewhat juvenile sense of humour, a strong sense of adventure, a will of iron and very strong morals.

Unlike his TV counterpart, for whom the character's name is ambiguous, his surname is clearly stated to be "Who" in both films.

Companions
In the first film, Dr. Who travels with his two granddaughters: Susan (Roberta Tovey), who is portrayed as a younger character than the Susan depicted in the TV series, and Barbara (Jennie Linden). They are joined by Ian Chesterton (Roy Castle), Barbara's "new boyfriend", who is depicted as a generally clumsy and comical figure (whereas the TV version of the character is more heroic, and his relationship with Barbara is amicable and professional rather than romantic).

In the sequel, Susan is joined by Dr. Who's niece Louise (Jill Curzon) and police constable Tom Campbell (Bernard Cribbins).

Tardis
The exterior of Dr. Who's Tardis (not "the TARDIS", as referred to in the television series) resembles a British police box, although the films, unlike the TV series, offer no explanation as to why the machine has this appearance. Other than using the contrivance of the craft's interior being larger than its exterior, the interior set bears no relation to the clean, high-tech TV version of the time. In the first film it is filled with a chaotic jumble of wiring and electronic equipment, replaced in the second film by a number of simple consoles adorned with buttons, gauges and lights.

Other appearances
In addition to the two films, Dr. Who has appeared in a Dell comic book adaptation of the film (1966), the Doctor Who Magazine comic strip stories Daleks Versus the Martians (1996) and Dr. Who and the Mechonoids (2022), and the short story The House on Oldark Moor by Justin Richards, published in the BBC Books collection Short Trips and Sidesteps (2000).

He is referenced in Steven Moffat’s novelisation of The Day of the Doctor (2018). In this story, the tenth and eleventh Doctors are stated to be fans of the Dalek movies and friends of Cushing. This was brought to the attention of UNIT when he started to show up in films made after his death.

Proposed radio series
During the late 1960s, there were plans for a radio series starring Peter Cushing as the voice of Dr. Who. Under a collaboration between Stanmark Productions and Watermill Productions, a pilot was recorded and a further 52 episodes were to be produced. The pilot story (entitled Journey into Time) featured Dr. Who and his granddaughter travelling to the time of the American Revolution. The script was written by future Doctor Who TV series writer Malcolm Hulke. Although the recording was subsequently lost, the script was novelised by Obverse Books in 2019.

Unofficial charity book series
Obverse Books have published a series of books featuring Cushing's Dr. Who character, starting with novelisations of the two films and continuing with "novelisations" of fictional films based on BBC Doctor Who serials. The book series also includes short story collections based on a fictional radio series, posited as a continuation of the unaired radio series pilot. The authors of these books prefer to remain anonymous, so various pseudonyms are used.

Dr Who and the Daleks (2019, novelisation by "Alan Smithee")
Daleks Invasion Earth 2150AD (2019, novelisation by "Alan Smithee")
Dr Who and the Ice Men from Mars (2019, by "Alan Smithee")
The Tenth Planet Invades the Moonbase (2019, by "Alan Smithee")
Dr Who and the Yeti Invasion of London (2020, by "David Agnew")
Dr Who: Journey into Time (2020, short story collection edited by "David Agnew")
Dr Who and the Auton Attack (2020, by "David Agnew")
Dr Who and the Curse of the Dæmons (2020, by "David Agnew")
Dr Who: Escape to Danger (2022, short story collection edited by "Robin Bland")
Dr Who: Missions to the Unknown (2022, short story collection edited by "Guy Leopold")
Dr Who and the Claus of Axos (2022, by "Robin Bland")

References 

Doctor Who Doctors
Fictional inventors
Film characters introduced in 1965
Fictional people from London
Science fiction film characters